Candidatus theologiæ (male), Candidata theologiæ (female), abbreviated cand. theol. is an academic degree with a long tradition, awarded after a six-year higher education in theology in Iceland, Denmark, and Norway.  In Norway, the title has remained after the "Quality Reform". In Denmark the title is described as equivalent to Master of Theology, while in Norway it ranks higher.
The title is protected by law in Denmark and Norway. In Norway it can only be issued by four institutions, NLA Høgskolen, the University of Oslo, the MF Norwegian School of Theology, Oslo and the School of Mission and Theology, now VID Specialized University, Stavanger. The latter three are private.

See Also 

 Bologna Process
 Quality Reform
 cand.mag. (arts)
 cand.scient. (sciences)
 cand.real. (mathematics)
 cand.polit. (social sciences)
 cand.philol. (humanities)
 cand.oecon. (economics)
 cand.jur. (law)
 cand.theol. (theology)
 cand.psychol. (clinical psychology)
 cand.med. (medicine)
 cand.med.vet. (medicine veterinary)
 cand.agro. (agronomy)
 siv.ing. (engineering)
 siv.ek. (management)

References 

Master's degrees
Academic degrees of Denmark
Academic degrees of Norway
Religious degrees